Conchopoma is an extinct genus of lungfish which lived during the Carboniferous and Permian period. Fossils have been found in United States.

References 

Prehistoric lungfish genera
Carboniferous bony fish
Permian bony fish
Fossils of the United States